This article concerns the period 809 BC – 800 BC.

Events and trends
 804 BC—Adad-nirari III of Assyria conquers Damascus. 
 c. 800 BC—Greek Dark Ages end.
 c. 800 BC—Archaic period in Greece begins. (It ends in 480 BC with the invasion of Xerxes.) This was in the middle ages 
 From c. 800 BC – The Upanishads are composed.
 c. 800 BC–700 BC—Pre-Etruscan period in Italy.
 Etruscan civilization.
 The Olmecs build pyramids.
808 BC The Kingdom of Macedon has started with the first king Caranas I

References